"Battito di ciglia" is a song performed by Italian singer Francesca Michielin. The song was released as a digital download on 10 July 2015 through Sony Music Entertainment Italy as the second single from her second studio album di20 (2015). The song peaked at number 64 on the Italian Singles Chart.

Music video
A music video to accompany the release of "Battito di ciglia" was first released onto YouTube on 10 July 2015 at a total length of three minutes and thirty-eight seconds. It was directed by Giacomo Triglia.

Track listing

Chart performance

Weekly charts

Certifications

Release history

References

2015 songs
2015 singles
Francesca Michielin songs
Songs written by Fortunato Zampaglione
Song recordings produced by Michele Canova
Songs written by Michele Canova